The UEFA Euro 2024 qualifying tournament is an upcoming football competition that will be played from March 2023 to March 2024 to determine the 23 UEFA member men's national teams that will join the automatically qualified host team Germany in the UEFA Euro 2024 final tournament. The competition will be linked with the 2022–23 UEFA Nations League, which will give countries a secondary route to qualify for the final tournament.

A total of 53 UEFA member associations entered the qualifying process. The draw for the qualifying group stage took place at the Festhalle in Frankfurt on 9 October 2022.

Qualified teams

{| class="wikitable sortable"
|-
! Team
! Qualified as
! Qualified on
! data-sort-type="number"|Previous appearances in tournament
|-
|  ||  ||  || 13 (1972, 1976, 1980, 1984, 1988, 1992, 1996, 2000, 2004, 2008, 2012, 2016, 2020)
|}

Format
The format is similar to the UEFA Euro 2020 qualifying competition: the group stage will decide 20 of the 23 teams that will advance to the final tournament to join hosts Germany. The 53 UEFA member associations were divided into ten groups, with seven groups containing five teams and three containing six teams. The draw for the qualifying group stage took place on 9 October 2022, after conclusion of the league phase of the 2022–23 UEFA Nations League. The four UEFA Nations League Finals participants were drawn into groups of five teams (so they are able to compete in the Nations League Finals in June 2023). The qualifying group stage will be played in a home-and-away, round-robin format on double matchdays in March, June, September, October and November 2023. The winners and runners-up from the ten groups will qualify directly to the final tournament.

Following the qualifying group stage, the remaining three teams will be decided through the play-offs, to be held in March 2024. Twelve teams will be selected based on their performance in the 2022–23 UEFA Nations League. These teams will be divided into three paths, each containing four teams, with one team from each path qualifying for the final tournament. The group winners of Nations Leagues A, B and C will automatically qualify for the play-off path of their league unless they have qualified for the final tournament via the qualifying group stage. If a group winner has already qualified through the qualifying group stage, they will be replaced by the next best-ranked team in the same league. However, if there are not enough non-qualified teams in the same league, then the spot will go first to the best-ranked group winner of League D, unless that team has already qualified for the final tournament. The remaining slots are then allocated to next best team in the Nations League overall ranking. However, group winners of Leagues B and C cannot face teams from a higher league.

The three play-off paths will each feature two single-leg semi-finals, and one single-leg final. In the semi-finals, the best-ranked team will host the fourth-ranked team, and the second-ranked team will host the third-ranked team. The host of the final will be drawn between the winners of the semi-final pairings. The three play-off path winners will join the twenty teams that already qualified for the final tournament through the group stage.

Tiebreakers for group ranking
If two or more teams are equal on points on completion of the group matches, the following tie-breaking criteria are applied:

 Higher number of points obtained in the matches played among the teams in question;
 Superior goal difference in matches played among the teams in question;
 Higher number of goals scored in the matches played among the teams in question;
 If, after having applied criteria 1 to 3, teams still have an equal ranking, criteria 1 to 3 are reapplied exclusively to the matches between the teams in question to determine their final rankings. If this procedure does not lead to a decision, criteria 5 to 11 apply;
 Superior goal difference in all group matches;
 Higher number of goals scored in all group matches;
 Higher number of away goals scored in all group matches;
 Higher number of wins in all group matches;
 Higher number of away wins in all group matches;
 Fair play conduct in all group matches (1 point for a single yellow card, 3 points for a red card as a consequence of two yellow cards, 3 points for a direct red card, 4 points for a yellow card followed by a direct red card);
 Position in the UEFA Nations League overall ranking.
Notes

Criteria for overall ranking
To determine the overall rankings of the European Qualifiers, results against teams in sixth place are discarded and the following criteria are applied:
 Position in the group;
 Higher number of points;
 Superior goal difference;
 Higher number of goals scored;
 Higher number of goals scored away from home;
 Higher number of wins;
 Higher number of wins away from home;
 Fair play conduct (1 point for a single yellow card, 3 points for a red card as a consequence of two yellow cards, 3 points for a direct red card, 4 points for a yellow card followed by a direct red card);
 Position in the UEFA Nations League overall ranking.

Schedule
Below is the schedule of the UEFA Euro 2024 qualifying campaign.

Draw
The qualifying group stage draw was held on 9 October 2022, 12:00 CEST, at the Festhalle in Frankfurt. Of UEFA's 55 member associations, 53 will compete in the qualifying competition. Host team Germany qualified directly to the final tournament, while it was confirmed on 20 September 2022 that Russia were ineligible due to the suspension from FIFA and UEFA competitions following their country's invasion of Ukraine.

The 53 UEFA national teams were seeded into six pots based on the 2022–23 UEFA Nations League overall ranking following the conclusion of the league phase. The four participants of the 2023 UEFA Nations League Finals were placed into the UNL Pot and drawn into Groups A–D, which only have five teams, so that they only have to play eight qualifying matches, leaving two free matchdays to play in Nations League Finals in June 2023. The next six-highest teams were then placed into Pot 1. If Germany had won their Nations League group, the UNL Pot would have contained three teams, and Pot 1 would have instead contained seven teams. Pots 2 to 5 contained ten teams, while Pot 6 contained the three lowest-ranked teams. The teams were drawn into ten groups: seven groups of five teams (Groups A–G) and three groups of six teams (Groups H–J). The draw started with the UNL Pot and Pot 1, and continued from Pot 2 to Pot 6, from where a team was drawn and assigned to the first available group (based on draw conditions) in alphabetical order.

The following restrictions were applied with computer assistance:
Prohibited clashes: For political reasons, matches between the following pairs of teams were considered prohibited clashes, unable to be drawn into the same group: Armenia / Azerbaijan, Belarus / Ukraine, Gibraltar / Spain, Kosovo / Bosnia and Herzegovina, Kosovo / Serbia.
Winter venues: A maximum of two teams whose venues were identified as having high or medium risk of severe winter conditions could be placed in each group: Belarus, Estonia, Faroe Islands, Finland, Iceland, Latvia, Lithuania, Norway.
The two "hard winter venues", Faroe Islands and Iceland, generally cannot host games in March or November; the others shall play as few home matches as possible in March and November.
Excessive travel: A maximum of one pair of teams identified with excessive travel distance in relation to other countries could be placed in each group:
Azerbaijan: with Gibraltar, Iceland, Portugal.
Iceland: with Cyprus, Georgia, Israel. (Armenia were also identified with Iceland for excessive travel distance, but the teams were in the same pot for the draw.)
Kazakhstan: with Andorra, England, France, Gibraltar, Iceland, Malta, Northern Ireland, Portugal, Republic of Ireland, Scotland, Spain, Wales. (Faroe Islands were also identified with Kazakhstan for excessive travel distance, but the teams were in the same pot for the draw.)

Seeding
The teams were seeded based on the September 2022 UEFA Nations League overall rankings.

Groups
The fixture list was confirmed by UEFA on 10 October 2022, the day following the draw. The schedule was initially released on the day of the draw, but was withdrawn shortly after its distribution due to an alleged calendar issue. However, UEFA ultimately confirmed the initial schedule the following day, with no changes made. Group matches will take place from 23 March to 21 November 2023.

Group A

Group B

Group C

Group D

Group E

Group F

Group G

Group H

Group I

Group J

Play-offs

Teams that fail in the qualifying group stage can still qualify for the final tournament through the play-offs. Leagues A, B, and C in the UEFA Nations League will be allocated one of the three remaining final tournament spots. Four teams from each league that have not already qualified for the European Championship finals will compete in the play-offs of their league. The play-off berths were first allocated to each Nations League group winner, and if any of the group winners already qualify for the European Championship finals, then to the next-best ranked team of the league.

Team selection
The team selection process will determine the twelve teams that will compete in the play-offs based on the Nations League overall rankings, using a set of criteria that obey these principles:
 Leagues A, B, and C each form a path with the four best-ranked teams not yet qualified.
 If one of those leagues has fewer than four non-qualifying teams, spots are taken first by the best group winner from League D (unless already qualified), and then by the next-best teams based on ranking.
 Group winners from Leagues B and C cannot face teams from higher leagues.

Overall ranking
The overall rankings will be used for seeding in the final tournament draw. Results against sixth-placed teams will not be considered in the ranking.

References

External links
UEFA Euro 2024, UEFA.com
European Qualifiers, UEFA.com

 
Qualifying
2024
Euro Qualifying
Euro Qualifying
March 2023 sports events in Europe
June 2023 sports events in Europe
September 2023 sports events in Europe
October 2023 sports events in Europe
November 2023 sports events in Europe
March 2024 sports events in Europe
Sports events affected by the 2022 Russian invasion of Ukraine